Alan Dale (14 November 1929 – 21 April 2007) was an Australian rules footballer who played for Essendon and St Kilda in the Victorian Football League (VFL).

Recruited to Essendon from local club Doutta Stars, Dale debuted in the 1950 VFL season and ended the year with a premiership. Dale, a centreman, captain-coached the Wangaratta Rovers in the 1954 and 1955 Ovens & Murray Football League seasons. He returned to Essendon in 1956, but later in the year switched to St Kilda.

Dale played with Belgrave, Oakleigh and Mt Waverley after leaving the VFL.

References

Essendon Football Club players
Essendon Football Club Premiership players
St Kilda Football Club players
Oakleigh Football Club players
Australian rules footballers from Victoria (Australia)
Wangaratta Rovers Football Club players
Wangaratta Rovers Football Club coaches
Doutta Stars Football Club players
1929 births
2007 deaths
One-time VFL/AFL Premiership players